Tsuboi (written: ,  or ) is a Japanese surname. Notable people with the surname include:

, Japanese footballer
, Japanese writer and poet 
, Japanese poet
, Japanese racing driver
, Japanese figure skater
, Japanese baseball player
, Japanese voice actor
, Japanese swimmer

Japanese-language surnames